Artystone (Elamite) was a Persian princess, daughter of king Cyrus the Great, and sister or half-sister of Cambyses II, Atossa and Smerdis (Bardiyā). Along with Atossa and her niece Parmys, Artystone married king Darius I.  It is argued that by marrying the female offspring of Cyrus, the founder of the empire, the new king aimed to prevent his rule from being contested, since Darius himself was not of royal blood.  

Artystone and Darius had at least two sons, Arsames and Gobryas, and a daughter, Artazostre.  According to the Greek historian Herodotus Artystone was Darius' favourite wife. She is also mentioned in the Persepolis Fortification Tablets, an administrative archive from Persepolis.

According to James Ussher, Artystone may have been another name for the biblical queen Esther, since Herodotus also called her Artystone the Virgin. While Esther is commonly known as the wife of Xerxes or Artaxerxes, the Book of Esther lists her cousin Mordecai as present during Nebuchadnezzar's capture of Jehconiah in 599 BC, and Josephus referencing him as a contemporary of Darius, making it impossible for Mordecai to be alive during Xerxes' or Artexerxes' reigns.

Primary sources
Herodotus, 3.88.2 bis; 7.69.2; 7.72.2.
The Persepolis Fortification Archive
Annals of the World by James Ussher, 797; 1036

Notes

References
Brosius, M. (1998): Woman in Ancient Persia.
"Artystone", in W. Smith (ed.), A Dictionary of Greek and Roman biography and mythology.
Lendering, J (2007 [1999]): "Artystone", in https://www.livius.org/
Schmitt, R (1987): "Artystone", in E. Yarshater (ed.), Encyclopaedia Iranica, vol. II.
James Ussher (1650): Annals of the World.
Josephus, F: Antiquities of the Jews, Book 11

6th-century BC women
5th-century BC women
6th-century BC births
5th-century BC deaths
6th-century BC Iranian people
Achaemenid princesses
Family of Darius the Great
Teispids